Lucian Büeler (28 March 1910 – 6 February 1952) was a Swiss civil engineer and figure skater. He was the 1935-1937 Swiss national champion. He represented Switzerland at the 1936 Winter Olympics where he placed 17th. As a civil engineer, he worked in Argentina from 1939 to 1947 and constructed South America's first artificial ice rink in Buenos Aires.

Competitive highlights

References

External links 
 
 List of Historical Swiss Champions

Swiss male single skaters
Olympic figure skaters of Switzerland
Figure skaters at the 1936 Winter Olympics
Swiss civil engineers
1910 births
1952 deaths
Figure skaters from Zürich